Glynn Pedersen (born 29 April 1981) is a British ski jumper. He competed in the normal hill and large hill events at the 2002 Winter Olympics.  His 14th place in the 2nd tier Continental Cup competition on the normal hill at Ishpeming, Michigan, USA on 19 January 2002 is the highest position achieved by a British jumper at an FIS event. He held the British ski jumping record between September 2001 and April 2017 with a jump of 113.50m.  The distance was surpassed by Jake Lock.

References

1981 births
Living people
British male ski jumpers
Olympic ski jumpers of Great Britain
Ski jumpers at the 2002 Winter Olympics
Sportspeople from Thunder Bay